Newmarket railway station is located on the Craigieburn line in Victoria, Australia. It serves the northern Melbourne suburb of Flemington, and it opened on 1 November 1860.

History

Newmarket station opened on 1 November 1860, just over a week after the railway line to Essendon opened as part of the private Melbourne and Essendon Railway Company. The station closed with the line on 1 July 1864, but was reopened on 9 October 1871, under government ownership. The name of the station comes from the fact that land was granted in 1858 for the establishment of the Newmarket Saleyards and the Melbourne City Abattoir. Both the abattoir and saleyards opened in 1861, with livestock relocating from the "old market" on the corner of Elizabeth and Victoria Streets, near the Melbourne CBD.

In 1886, a permanent station building was built and, in 1925, the present buildings were provided. In 1880, interlocking and a signal box, for the Flemington Racecourse line junction, were brought into use and, in 1969, became remotely controlled from Kensington.

During April and May 1994, the timber decking across Racecourse Road was replaced, with the tracks laid on concrete, and new concrete abutments on both sides of the bridge being laid. The current bridge over Racecourse Road is the third bridge on site.

During construction of CityLink in 1997-1998, the station was used for passengers to shuttle to and from Flemington Bridge station on the Upfield line, due to services not running between Flemington Bridge and North Melbourne, and the temporary closure of Macaulay station. This was to allow elevated roads, linking the West Gate and Tullamarine Freeways, to be constructed.

On 4 May 2010, as part of the 2010/2011 State Budget, $83.7 million was allocated to upgrade Newmarket to a Premium Station, along with nineteen others. However, in March 2011, this was scrapped by the Baillieu Government.

In 2014, it became obvious that structural problems were affecting the building on Platform 1, which is elevated and on concrete piers, on which cracks and concrete cancer were evident. The retaining wall at the back of the platform was also exhibiting extensive concrete cancer. Metal props were inserted to shore up the piers, and the cantilevered awning over the platform was demolished, and replaced by a temporary timber structure. Half of the large ramp from street level to the station entrance was removed, partly to allow three steel straps to be bolted to the outside of the building, to support the wall. Parts of the building were eventually demolished in that year.

Special services to Flemington Racecourse and Showgrounds stations pass through the station, but do not stop, with signs on Platform 2 advising passengers of this. The junction for the Flemington Racecourse line is located immediately north of the station.

Platforms and services

Newmarket has two side platforms. It is serviced by Metro Trains' Craigieburn line services.

Platform 1:
  all stations services to Flinders Street

Platform 2:
  all stations services to Craigieburn

Transport links

Yarra Trams operates one route via Newmarket station:
 : West Maribyrnong – Flinders Street station (Elizabeth Street Melbourne CBD)

Gallery

References

External links

 Melway map at street-directory.com.au

Flemington, Victoria
Railway stations in Australia opened in 1860
Railway stations in Melbourne
Railway stations in the City of Moonee Valley